HMS Largs was a former Compagnie Generale Transatlantique (French Line) fruit (banana) ship captured by the Royal Navy ship HMS Faulknor  five months after the Battle of France while docked at Gibraltar in November 1940 and commissioned as an "ocean boarding vessel".  She subsequently became a Combined Operations Headquarters ship for almost every significant amphibious operation of World War II, including Operations Torch, Husky and Overlord and she would be manned by naval, army and air force crew.

Royal Navy Transfer
She was built by France and named MV Charles Plumier  in 1938. Following the creation of Vichy France and Free France she was transferred in 1941 to the Royal Navy, instead of being handed over to the Free French Navy, and renamed HMS Largs. She took part in many operations including Operation Torch, the invasion of North Africa, and Operation Overlord, during the invasion of Normandy.  she was the headquarters ship for Sword Beach.

Camouflage research

HMS Largs was used in 1942 for secret trials of a Canadian invention, diffused lighting camouflage. This used dimmable lamps for counter-illumination, camouflage by bringing the brightness of the ship's superstructure to the same as the night sky. The system of 60 lamps reduced the distance at which a ship could be seen from a surfaced submarine by 25% using binoculars, or by 33% using the naked eye. It worked best on clear moonless nights, at best preventing Largs from being seen until it closed to  when counter-illuminated, compared to  unlighted, a 57% reduction in range. However, with the development of marine radar, the system was not put into service.

Pacific & Post WWII
In 1945 she was transferred to the Pacific War and used in actions off Thailand and Malaya. After the end of the war she was handed back to France, and served for nineteen years. She was sold off to a private company from Greece in 1964 as a cruise ship, and given the name MV Pleias. She was scrapped in 1968.

References

Bibliography

External links
 BBC WW2 People's War: Happy Landings- the travels of HMS Largs

1938 ships
World War II merchant ships of France
Auxiliary ships of the Royal Navy
World War II auxiliary ships of the United Kingdom
Cruise ships of Greece
Captured ships